Ab Jaz (also Romanized as Āb Jāz; also known as Āb Jārī and Āb Jāzī) is a village in Pian Rural District, in the Central District of Izeh County, Khuzestan Province, Iran. At the 2006 census, its population was 29, in 4 families.

References 

Populated places in Izeh County